Hexommulocymus is a monotypic genus of South American crab spiders containing the single species, Hexommulocymus kolosvaryi. It was first described by Lodovico di Caporiacco in 1955, and is found in Venezuela.

See also
 List of Thomisidae species

References

Monotypic Araneomorphae genera
Spiders of South America
Thomisidae